Hassane Azzoun (born September 28, 1979) is an Algerian judoka, who played for the half-heavyweight category. He is a six-time medalist at the African Judo Championships, and also, a bronze medalist for his division at the 2007 All-Africa Games in Algiers.

At age twenty-nine, Azzoun made his official debut for the 2008 Summer Olympics in Beijing, where he competed for the men's half-heavyweight class (100 kg). He lost his first preliminary match by an ippon and a sode tsurikomi goshi (sleeve lifting and pulling hip throw) to Azerbaijan's Movlud Miraliyev. Because his opponent advanced further into the semi-finals, Azzoun offered another shot for the bronze medal by entering the repechage rounds. He was defeated in his first match by Georgia's Levan Zhorzholiani, who successfully scored an ippon and a kuzure kami shiho gatame (seven mat holds), at three minutes and fifty-four seconds.

References

External links

NBC Olympics Profile

Algerian male judoka
Living people
Olympic judoka of Algeria
Judoka at the 2008 Summer Olympics
1979 births
African Games bronze medalists for Algeria
African Games medalists in judo
Competitors at the 2007 All-Africa Games
21st-century Algerian people